Pisarzowice may refer to:

Pisarzowice, Greater Poland Voivodeship (west-central Poland)
Pisarzowice, Kamienna Góra County in Lower Silesian Voivodeship (south-west Poland)
Pisarzowice, Lubań County in Lower Silesian Voivodeship (south-west Poland)
Pisarzowice, Środa Śląska County in Lower Silesian Voivodeship (south-west Poland)
Pisarzowice, Brzeg County in Opole Voivodeship (south-west Poland)
Pisarzowice, Krapkowice County in Opole Voivodeship (south-west Poland)
Pisarzowice, Bielsko County in Silesian Voivodeship (south Poland)
Pisarzowice, Gliwice County in Silesian Voivodeship (south Poland)